The Little Thredbo River, a perennial river of the Snowy River catchment, is located in the Snowy Mountains region of New South Wales, Australia.

Course and features
The Little Thredbo River rises below Moonbah Mountain, within the Kosciuszko National Park near Camp Flat, and flows generally northeast by north before reaching its confluence with the Thredbo River, near the Bullocks Flat Terminal. The river descends  over its  course.

See also

 List of rivers of New South Wales (L-Z)
 List of rivers of Australia
 Rivers of New South Wales

References

 

Rivers of New South Wales
Snowy Mountains